La Unión is a department of El Salvador. It is located in the eastern part of the country and its capital is La Unión. The department was created on June 22, 1865, and the city of La Unión was made its capital. The Conchagua Temple was built in 1693 and it is one of tourist attractions of the department, as well as containing archeological ruins in Intipucá and Meanguera.

Municipalities
 Anamorós
 Bolívar
 Concepción de Oriente
 Conchagua
 El Carmen
 El Sauce
 Intipucá
 La Unión
 Lislique
 Meanguera del Golfo
 Nueva Esparta
 Pasaquina
 Polorós
 San Alejo
 San José
 Santa Rosa de Lima
 Yayantique
 Yucuaiquín

Natural resources 
The most important agricultural products are coffee, grass, fruits, cocoa, oleaginous seeds, and sugar cane. The manufacturing of palm and tortoiseshell products, panela, mangrove extract, and fish. It also has reserves of gold, iron, barium, and mercury.

External links 
El Salvador at GeoHive
pasaquinacity.com

 
Departments of El Salvador
States and territories established in 1865